Bridge of Allan railway station is a railway station located in the town of Bridge of Allan, north of Stirling, Scotland. It lies between Stirling and Dunblane on the Highland Main Line, Glasgow to Aberdeen Line and Edinburgh to Dunblane Line.

History

The original station, built by the Scottish Central Railway, was situated to the north of the A9 road and opened on 22 May 1848. The small station yard on the east (southbound) side of the line, long disused, has been used for new residential accommodation, and the old station house also remains in residential use. On 1 November 1965 the station was closed.

The new station, immediately to the south of the A9, was opened on 13 May 1985. This has allowed better facilities for car parking to be provided. Reopening by British Rail followed an increase in population and employment in the area, partly due to the relatively new University of Stirling situated to the east of Bridge of Allan.

Services
It is served by two trains per hour in each direction to Stirling and Dunblane. On Sundays, there is an hourly service in each direction on the Edinburgh to Dunblane route but there are no direct trains to/from Glasgow.

Train services are operated by ScotRail, consisting mainly of Class 385, Class 170 and occasionally a Class 43. The station is equipped with a passenger information system and waiting shelters.

Electrification of the Edinburgh–Dunblane line took place in 2018, which resulted in the DMUs used on this line being replaced by electric rolling stock.

References

Notes

Sources

External links

Video footage and history of Bridge of Allan Station

Railway stations in Stirling (council area)
Railway stations in Great Britain opened in 1848
Railway stations in Great Britain closed in 1965
Railway stations in Great Britain opened in 1985
Former Caledonian Railway stations
Railway stations served by ScotRail
Beeching closures in Scotland